Xaa-Arg dipeptidase (aminoacyl-lysine dipeptidase, N2-(4-amino-butyryl)-L-lysine hydrolase, X-Arg dipeptidase) is an enzyme. This enzyme catalyses the following chemical reaction

 Preferential hydrolysis of Xaa!Arg, Xaa!Lys or Xaa!ornithine dipeptides

This enzyme is widely distributed in mammals.

References

External links 
 

EC 3.4.13